This article shows all participating team squads at the 2020 Summer Olympics European qualification tournament, held in the Netherlands from 7 to 12 January 2020.

Pool A

The following is the Dutch roster in the 2020 Summer Olympics qualification tournament.

Head coach: Giovanni Caprara

The following is the Bulgarian roster in the 2020 Summer Olympics qualification tournament.

Head coach: Ivan Petkov

The following is the Polish roster in the 2020 Summer Olympics qualification tournament.

Head coach: Jacek Nawrocki

The following is the Azerbaijan roster in the 2020 Summer Olympics qualification tournament.

Head coach: Vasif Talibov

Pool B

The following is the Turkish roster in the 2020 Summer Olympics qualification tournament.

Head coach: Giovanni Guidetti

The following is the German roster in the 2020 Summer Olympics qualification tournament.

Head coach: Felix Koslowski

The following is the Belgian roster in the 2020 Summer Olympics qualification tournament.

Head coach: Gert Van de Broek

The following is the Croatian roster in the 2020 Summer Olympics qualification tournament.

Head coach: Daniele Santarelli

See also
 Volleyball at the 2020 Summer Olympics – Men's European qualification squads

References

External links
Official website

2020 in volleyball
Volleyball qualification for the 2020 Summer Olympics
Olympic women's volleyball squads
2020 in women's volleyball